Dr. Mehta's Hospitals, founded in 1933, is one of the oldest private medical institutions in Chennai, Tamil Nadu, India. It is a multi-specialty tertiary care hospital with over 500 beds and two campuses located in Chetpet and Velappanchavadi . The institution provides over 80 medical-cum-surgical specialties and has a strong clinical background of over 600 expert clinical practitioners. The hospital takes pride in having served more than 20,000 families across two generations and more than 300 families across three generations. Since its inception, the hospital has delivered over million babies and successfully conducted over 250,000 surgeries inclusive of 100,000 complex surgical cases and 150 kidney transplant procedures.

History 
Dr. Mehta's Hospitals was established in the year 1933 by Dr. Anantrai J Mehta, a graduate of Stanley Medical College and practitioner of General Medicine as a small clinic cum nursing home with two beds in Sowcarpet, Chennai. It began providing medical services under the name Dr. Mehta's Nursing Home for the underprivileged and residents of the nearby community.

In the year 1940, the nursing home was jointly run by Dr. Anatraj J Mehta and his wife Dr. Savitaben Mehta, a graduate of Kilpauk Medical College and a Gynecologist trained by Indian and British Physicians of that time. Dr. Savitaben Mehta was also the first Gujarati female physician in Madras (presently Chennai) and played a vital role in establishing the foundation for the present-day Dr. Mehta's Hospitals.

In 1955, the nursing home was relocated to Chetpet and underwent an expansion to operate as a multi-specialty surgical and birthing unit. The facility was built on a 1200 sq. ft. plot and started functioning with one delivery room and two convalescence rooms with a total of 4 beds. During this period the hospital specialized in providing different medical services such as gynecology, internal Medicine, etc. They offered their service 24x7 and acted as family doctors for many families.

In 1977, Dr. Usha Shukla, their daughter and graduate from the University of Mysore joined Dr. Mehta’s Hospitals after having practiced medicine extensively at different hospitals across northern and southern India. Her interest in public health and focus on ensuring that each patient is well informed about the treatment offered to make informed decisions is followed as a fundamental procedure at Dr. Mehta’s Hospitals.

In the early 1990s their son Mr. Dilip Mehta, a graduate of Loyola College took over the hospital’s administration after having experienced running businesses in pharmaceuticals, food manufacturing, and distribution, trade in India and abroad. During this period the institution inducted the services of many physicians such as Dr. R. Shanmugasundaram, Dr Ahmed Ali, Dr. A N Parthasarthy, Dr. Annamalai, and Dr. Nammalwar. The addition of these health practitioners enabled this institution to qualify for obtaining recognition and accreditation as a teaching institute by National Accreditation Board for Hospitals and Healthcare Providers (NABH) and National Board of Examination (NBE).

Dr. Mehta’s Hospitals Private Limited got incorporated on 4 October 1994. The hospital is classified as a non-government company and has been registered by the Registrar of Companies, Chennai. Dr. Mehta’s Hospitals comes under the category of a Company limited by Shares and has an authorized share capital of 15,000,000 INR with a Paid-up Share Capital of 13,682,000 INR. The main objective of the company is human health activities and the directors are the main force operating this entity. The Directors of DR. MEHTA'S HOSPITALS PRIVATE LIMITED COMPANY presently are Mr. Sameer Dilip Mehta, Dr. Usha Anil Shukla, Mr. Dilipkumar Anantarai Mehta & Mr. Pranav Dilip Mehta. Dr. Mehta’s Hospitals experienced significant growth and expansion during the period of 1994-2006. The institution had transformed from Dr. Mehta’s Nursing Home into a leading tertiary care Dr. Mehta’s Hospitals Private Limited with over 200 beds.

In 2007, Mr. Sameer Mehta, grandson of Dr. Anantrai J Mehta joined Dr. Mehta’s Hospitals. His primary focus lies in harnessing technology to bring down the costs in healthcare. He has experience working and leading in companies such as Shell International, McKinsey & Company, and Atlas Advisory. Dr. Mehta’s Hospital under the leadership of Mr. Sameer Mehta is focusing on integrating modern healthcare and customer practice with the support of its experienced team of physicians, surgeons, super-specialists, and other clinical & administrative staff.  

Presently, Dr. Mehta’s Hospitals has two units within Chennai – Mehta’s Multispecialty Hospital India Pvt Ltd (Chetpet), The hospitals have over 250 beds and offer 81 specialties with the help of 500 specialists & clinical staff in Chetpet.

In 2014, Dr. Mehta’s Hospitals announced its plans to open new hospital, a branch of this 85+-year-old institution close to Chennai —Thiruverkadu on NH 4 to support its ever-growing incoming patient population.

Extension 
In 2018, Dr. Mehta’s Hospitals-Global Campus was inaugurated in Velappanchavadi, Thiruverkadu, Chennai. This facility was built to provide multispecialty tertiary care for patients from both India and abroad. As per the statement of CEO and Director Mr. Sameer Mehta "The new campus will see automated, highly technology-centric outpatient, critical care and emergency wards, in addition to digitized patient monitoring". The global campus has been set-up on a five and a half acre land with infrastructure and all the necessary facilities under the same roof.  This Greenfield hospital currently has 220 beds and with the addition of the already existing 250 beds in Chetpet, this hospital is part of Dr. Mehta’s 1000 bed project planned for the future.

Education 
Dr. Mehta’s Hospitals is a recognized teaching institute. In addition to functioning as a tertiary care hospital this institution also offers a variety of education and research programs, a few of which are:

DNB Post Graduate Program in:

 Neonatology
 Pediatric Intensive Care
 Obstetrics
 Gynecology

Post Doctoral Fellowship Program in:

 Neonatal
 Pediatric Intensive Care
 Pediatric Intensive Nephrology

Fellowship Program in:

 Emergency & Pediatric Emergency Medicine
 Pediatric Nephrology

BSc Undergraduate Program in:

 Accident & Emergency Medical care
 Operation Theatre & Anesthesia Technology

Healthcare Sector Skill Council of India (HSSC) Technicians Course in:

 Advanced Emergency
 Lab & Radiology

Achievements 

 The first hospital to successfully perform hypopharyngeal cancer surgery completely with laparoscopy in Tamil Nadu.

Accreditation 
National Accreditation Board for Hospitals & Healthcare Providers (NABH)

 Mehta's Children's Hospital Pvt. Ltd., Chennai, Tamil Nadu, India
 Mehta's Hospitals Pvt. Ltd., Chennai, Tamil Nadu

See also 

 Healthcare in Chennai

References 

Private hospitals in India
1933 establishments in India
Hospitals in Chennai
Health care companies of India
Hospital networks in India